Morris Robert Becker (February 24, 1917 – January 9, 1996) was an American professional basketball player. He played college basketball for the Duquesne Dukes. 

Barr played professionally for the Pittsburgh Ironmen, Boston Celtics and Detroit Falcons of the Basketball Association of America (BAA) for 43 games during the 1946–47 season. Becker also played for the Wilmington Blue Bombers, Philadelphia Sphas and Baltimore Bullets of the American Basketball League, the Youngstown Bears of the National Basketball League, and the Atlanta Crackers of the Professional Basketball League of America.

College career
Becker formed a trio known as the "Iron Dukes" with Duquesne teammates Ed Milkovich and Paul Widowitz that led the team to a 51–10 record in three seasons.

Professional career
Becker served in the United States Army at the Aberdeen Proving Ground during World War II. While at the facility, he played for teams in nearby Baltimore and Philadelphia.

Post-playing career
Becker returned to Pittsburgh after his playing career and served as a coach at Braddock High School.

Becker died of complications from Alzheimer's disease on January 9, 1996, in the Camelot Nursing Home in Peoria, Arizona.

BAA career statistics

Regular season

References

External links

1917 births
1996 deaths
All-American college men's basketball players
American men's basketball players
Basketball players from Pittsburgh
Boston Celtics players
Deaths from Alzheimer's disease
Detroit Falcons (basketball) players
Duquesne Dukes men's basketball players
Forwards (basketball)
Guards (basketball)
Pittsburgh Ironmen players
Professional Basketball League of America players
Youngstown Bears players